Central Western Ontario Secondary Schools Association, or CWOSSA, is the governing body of all secondary school athletic competitions in Bruce, Grey, Wellington, Dufferin, Waterloo, Brant and Norfolk counties of Ontario, Canada.

The CWOSSA Mandate 
To establish a closer relationship among the member schools of the Association
To encourage and promote sound interschool athletic competition among the students of the secondary schools of the member districts

Districts
CWOSSA is divided into several districts that have their own individual championships that qualify athletes for the CWOSSA championships for all sports. This regulation excludes the sport of Cross Country, which is an automatic qualification to CWOSSA for all athletes.
The districts are as follows:
District 1/7 (Bluewater Athletic Association - BAA)
District 4/10
District 5 (Brant County Secondary Schools' Athletic Association - BCSSAA)
District 6/11 (Waterloo County Secondary Schools Athletic Association - WCSSAA)
District 8
District 9 (Norfolk Secondary Schools Athletic Association - NSSAA)

Athletics
Only High Schools in the Bruce, Grey, Wellington, Dufferin, Waterloo, Brant and Norfolk counties compete within CWOSSA. The winning team (CWOSSA Champions) will go onto an OFSAA Tournament. The following sports are played through CWOSSA:
Volleyball
football
Gymnastics
Basketball
Tennis
Soccer
Badminton
Wrestling
Rugby
Swim Team
Cross Country
Curling
Hockey
Golf
Nordic Skiing
Track & Field
Swimming
Figure skating
Mountain Biking
Track and Field

References 

Educational organizations based in Ontario